Saintus is a surname. Notable people with the surname include:

Dane Saintus (born 1987), American soccer player
Jeanguy Saintus (born 1964), Haitian choreographer, dancer, and dancing educator